The 1939 World Table Tennis Championships were held in Cairo from March 6 to March 11, 1939.

Only 11 men's teams and 5 women's teams entered the Championships. Hungary, the United States and Austria were the major nations missing. Viktor Barna and Richard Bergmann played under the England flag for the first time.

Medalists

Team

Individual

References

External links
ITTF Museum

 
World Table Tennis Championships
World Table Tennis Championships
World Table Tennis Championships
Table tennis competitions in Egypt
International sports competitions hosted by Egypt
Sports competitions in Cairo
March 1939 sports events
1930s in Cairo